Palazzo Borromeo ("Borromeo Palace") is the name of a number of buildings found in different places in Italy, all related to the House of Borromeo:

 Palazzo Borromeo (Angera)
 Palazzo Borromeo (Isola Bella)
 Palazzo Borromeo (Isola Madre)
 Palazzo Borromeo (Milan)
 Palazzo Borromeo (Montecarlo)
 Palazzo Borromeo (Quattromiglia)
 Palazzo Borromeo (Rome)
 Palazzo Borromeo (Verbania)
 Palazzo Borromeo d'Adda (Milan)
 Palazzo Borromeo Arese (Sedriano)
 Palazzo Borromeo Fantoni (San Giorgio in Brenta)
Palazzo Arese Borromeo (Cesano Maderno)
 Palazzo Gabrielli-Borromeo (Rome)

See also
Villa Borromeo